Arush Entertainment was a video game publisher and developer based in Scottsdale, Arizona, United States. It published interactive entertainment software for personal computers and advanced entertainment consoles. As a division of World Entertainment Broadcasting Corporation (Web Corp.,) Arush published PC and console video games for sale in retail outlets and on the Internet. In 2005, the company was bought by HIP Interactive, who eventually went bankrupt. The assets of Arush and HIP were held by a bankruptcy company. Scott Miller of 3D Realms at the time, attempted to acquire the rights to Duke Nukem: Manhatten Project, but was not successful. The current status of Arush's rights are unknown.

Published games

PC
 Devastation
 Duke Nukem: Manhattan Project
 Emergency 2
 Fear Factor: Unleashed
 Feeding Chloe
 Hunting Unlimited
 Hunting Unlimited 2
 Hunting Unlimited 3
 Monkey Brains
 Playboy: The Mansion
 Primal Prey
 RC Daredevil

PlayStation 2
 Fear Factor: Unleashed
 Playboy: The Mansion

Xbox
 Fear Factor: Unleashed
 Playboy: The Mansion

Developed games

PC
 Devastation
 Real Pool 2

References

External links 
 IGN.com – company profile 
 
 Arush Entertainment at UVL

Defunct companies based in Arizona
Companies based in Scottsdale, Arizona
Defunct video game companies of the United States
Video game development companies
Video game publishers